The canton of Champagnole is an administrative division of the Jura department, eastern France. Its borders were not modified at the French canton reorganisation which came into effect in March 2015. Its seat is in Champagnole.

It consists of the following communes:
 
Andelot-en-Montagne
Ardon
Bourg-de-Sirod
Champagnole
Chapois
Châtelneuf
Cize
Crotenay
Équevillon
Le Larderet
Le Latet
Lent
Loulle
Monnet-la-Ville
Montigny-sur-l'Ain
Montrond
Mont-sur-Monnet
Moutoux
Les Nans
Ney
Le Pasquier
Pillemoine
Pont-du-Navoy
Saint-Germain-en-Montagne
Sapois
Sirod
Supt
Syam
Valempoulières
Vannoz
Le Vaudioux
Vers-en-Montagne

References

Cantons of Jura (department)